West Woodhay Down is a  biological Site of Special Scientific Interest  in Berkshire and Hampshire. It is lowland Calcareous grassland with a northwest facing bank, and forms part of the northern slopes of Walbury Hill and Combe Hill. The site was formerly included as part of Inkpen and Walbury Hills SSSI.

West Woodhay Down is in the civil parishes of West Woodhay and East Woodhay, to the south-west of the town of Newbury. West Woodhay parish is within the unitary authority area of West Berkshire and the ceremonial county of Berkshire, whilst East Woodhay is within the district of Basingstoke and Deane in the administrative county of Hampshire.

Flora

The site has the following Flora:

Bromus erectus
Blackstonia perfoliata
Leontodon autumnalis
Linum catharticum
Galium cruciata
Asperula cynanchica
Primula veris
Scabiosa columbaria
Reseda lutea
Sanguisorba minor
Gymnadenia conopsea
Anacamptis pyramidalis
Helianthemum nummularium
Centaurea scabiosa
Campanula rotundifolia
Listera ovata
Herminium monorchis
Coeloglossum viride
Polygala calcarea
Saxifraga granulata
Crataegus
Whitebeam
Crataegus monogyna''

References

Sites of Special Scientific Interest in Berkshire
Sites of Special Scientific Interest in Hampshire